The Monastero di San Benedetto in Monte (English: Monastery of St. Benedict on the Mountain) is a male Benedictine community located in southeastern Umbria, just outside the city of Norcia, Italy.

The monks exclusively use the Extraordinary Form of the Roman Rite as well as the traditional form of the Divine Office. They have become well known for their production of beer, the sale of which provides income for the monastery, as well as for their best-selling album of Gregorian chant.

Until 2016, the monks were the custodians of the Basilica of San Benedetto in the center of Norcia, built above the birthplace of Saint Benedict of Nursia and Saint Scholastica. The Basilica and Monastery were destroyed in October 2016 in an earthquake which damaged much of Norcia and the surrounding area. As a result, the monks relocated to an abandoned Capuchin monastery and church located on a hillside 1.6 miles (2.6 km) east of the center of Norcia, where they have constructed temporary accommodations and are constructing a larger, permanent monastery.

History
In the 8th century an oratory was built in Norcia so pilgrims could pray at the place of St. Benedict's birth.  Monks came to Norcia in the 10th century, and remained in one form or another until 1810, when the Napoleonic Code forced the closure of the monastery.  The current Benedictine community was founded in September 1998 by Fr. Cassian Folsom, an American monk of St. Meinrad Archabbey in Indiana, who served as its first prior. He and two other monks began the community in Rome, before moving to Norcia in December 2000 at the invitation of the Archbishop of Spoleto-Norcia. They were charged to care for the Basilica of San Benedetto and for the many visiting pilgrims, and the community grew steadily over the years. The monastery was canonically established in 1999 and became an independent priory sui iuris in 2018 in the Benedictine confederation under the jurisdiction of the Abbot Primate.

In October 2016 a 6.6 magnitude earthquake destroyed the 14th-century basilica as well as most of the monastery. Although none of the monks were injured, they, like thousands of others throughout Umbria, were left homeless. As a result, the monks moved outside the city to an abandoned monastery that was once part of a Capuchin friary, and later was used as the seminary of the Diocese of Norcia. It was abandoned in the mid-20th century after the Diocese of Norcia was merged with that of nearby Spoleto. The monks had originally purchased the badly dilapidated church with the hopes of turning it into a monastic grange. In November 2016, Fr. Cassian announced that he was stepping down as prior, saying that he lacked the energy necessary to head the community in the process of rebuilding. Fr. Benedict Nivakoff, an American who had previously served as subprior and novice master, became the new prior. Since 2016 the monks have constructed several temporary structures on their new site, including a chapel, cells, refectory and library, and are currently building a larger permanent structure. As of January 2023, there are 20 monks in the community.

Charism and daily life
The monks' life of conversion is rooted in the traditional praying of the Divine Office seven times during the day and once during the night. The monks chant the full Office in Latin and offer the Holy Mass each day in the traditional form of the Roman Rite. The monks dedicate their prayers to those who have asked them for intercession, Church and world. The monks have shared their chants in many ways since the founding of their community, most notably in the release of a Billboard-topping album in 2015. Benedicta, the monks’ CD of Marian chants.

Following the Rule of Saint Benedict, the monks’ schedule of prayers follows the patterns of the sun, and therefore changes slightly throughout the year as the days wax and wane.

In accordance with Benedictine tradition, the monks regularly host visitors who come either for a retreat or to discern a vocation. The guests are welcome to join the monks for Conventual Mass every day according to the schedule published on the monastery website.

Coat of arms

The coat of arms of the monastery is divided into two sections.  On the left hand side is the symbol of the Celestine monks who were present in Norcia before being suppressed by the Napoleonic laws of 1810, representing the continuity with the past. The Celestines were an ascetic branch of the Benedictines that became defunct at around the time of the Napoleonic code.

The right side of the seal represents the present: a stump with new shoots of life growing from it.  The stump represents monastic life violently cut off in 1810.  The new shoots of life represent the present community, and the three leaves represents the three original monks who arrived in Norcia in 2000.  As the prophet Isaiah says: "There shall come forth a shoot from the stump of Jesse, and a branch shall grow out of his roots" (Isaiah 11:1). This image has always been a sign of hope.

In 2019, after breaking ground and beginning to raise the walls of their new home, the monks added a motto to the monastery's crest: Nova Facio Omnia. Taken from the Book of the Apocalypse, it describes the New Jerusalem in all its splendor and underlines what Christ does for all who cooperate with His plan: “Behold, I make all things new!”

Birra Nursia  
Early in 2012 the Monks of Norcia established a brewery in a renovated warehouse.  They hosted a grand opening celebration on August 15, 2012 - the Solemnity of the Assumption of the Blessed Virgin Mary.  The name of the beer is “Birra Nursia”, using the Latin name for the city of Norcia and the motto of the brewery “ut laetificet cor” (that the heart might be gladdened). 
The monks explain this motto as follows:

As of 2023, the monks produce three varieties of beer: Extra, a Belgian-style dark ale, Tripel, an amber beer, and Bionda, a blonde ale. Norcia is famous for many food products, including truffles, wild boar, salumi, and cheeses. The monks designed their beer to pair with such local delicacies. Many of the shops, hotels, and restaurants in town have begun selling Birra Nursia to their customers.  As of March 2016, Birra Nursia is also available for purchase in the United States via their website.

See also

Communities using the Tridentine Mass

References

External links
 The Monks of Norcia Website 
 Birra Nursia
 The Catholic Encyclopedia
 Perfectae Caritatis 

Italian Christian monks
Christian religious orders established in the 6th century
Christian religious orders established in the 20th century
Catholic orders and societies
Beer in Italy
Celestine Order
Norcia
Communities using the Tridentine Mass